Igor Aleksandrovich Paradin (born 10 September 1998) is a Russian football player. He plays for FC Kuban-Holding Pavlovskaya.

Club career
He made his debut in the Russian Professional Football League for FC Krasnodar-2 on 29 July 2016 in a game against FC Sochi.

On 28 June 2019, he joined Czech club FK Teplice on loan.

References

External links
 Profile by Russian Professional Football League

1998 births
People from Mostovsky District
Living people
Russian footballers
Association football defenders
FC Krasnodar players
FK Teplice players
Russian expatriate footballers
Expatriate footballers in the Czech Republic
Czech First League players
FC Chayka Peschanokopskoye players
FC Krasnodar-2 players
FC Mashuk-KMV Pyatigorsk players
Sportspeople from Krasnodar Krai